Harcourt Wason (born 14 April 1956) is a Barbadian sprinter. He competed in the men's 4 × 400 metres relay at the 1976 Summer Olympics.

References

1956 births
Living people
Athletes (track and field) at the 1976 Summer Olympics
Barbadian male sprinters
Olympic athletes of Barbados
Place of birth missing (living people)